Rock Hill Cotton Factory, also known as Plej's Textile Mill Outlets, Ostrow Textile Mill, and Fewell Cotton Warehouse, is a historic textile mill complex located at Rock Hill, South Carolina.  The mill was built in 1881, and is a two-story, 12 bay by 16 bay, brick factory. It features a three-story tower at the main entrance.  A number of additions have been made to the building. The Fewell Cotton Warehouse is a one-story, brick and wood frame warehouse built before 1894.

It was listed on the National Register of Historic Places in 1992, with a boundary increase in 2008. The building is now used as a retail and office place known as the Cotton Factory Plaza.

References

External links
The Rock Hill Cotton Factory - Photos & History

Industrial buildings and structures on the National Register of Historic Places in South Carolina
Industrial buildings completed in 1881
Buildings and structures in Rock Hill, South Carolina
National Register of Historic Places in Rock Hill, South Carolina
Warehouses on the National Register of Historic Places
Cotton mills in the United States
1881 establishments in South Carolina